DeQuincy Scott (born March 5, 1978) is a former American football defensive tackle in the NFL. He was originally signed as an undrafted free agent in 2001 out of The University of Southern Mississippi by the San Diego Chargers. He has also played for the Tennessee Titans.

High school
Scott attended East St. John High School in Reserve and was a letterman in baseball and football.

References

1978 births
Living people
People from LaPlace, Louisiana
Players of American football from Louisiana
American football defensive tackles
Southern Miss Golden Eagles football players
San Diego Chargers players
Tennessee Titans players